Audie L. Murphy Memorial VA Hospital (STVHCS) is a care facility affiliated with the University of Texas Health Science Center at San Antonio  in Bexar County, in the U.S. state of Texas. It is operated by the United States Department of Veterans Affairs.

The hospital is named for Medal of Honor recipient and Texas native son Audie Murphy, who died in a plane crash on May 28, 1971. That same year, U.S. Congressman Olin Teague introduced legislation to name a planned Veterans Administration medical facility in San Antonio for Murphy. The facility was dedicated November 17, 1973.

References

Hospital buildings completed in 1973
Government buildings completed in 1973
Healthcare in San Antonio
University of Texas Health Science Center at San Antonio
Veterans Affairs medical facilities
Audie Murphy